The Lonergan Review is a peer reviewed academic journal dedicated to the exploration of the thought and legacy of Bernard Lonergan (1904–1984). The purpose of the journal is to promote continuing interest in the field of Lonergan studies. It was established in 2009 as the official journal of the Bernard J. Lonergan Institute by the Center for Catholic Studies at Seton Hall University, and is distributed by the Philosophy Documentation Center. Richard Liddy is its director.

External links
 
 Bernard J. Lonergan Institute

Annual journals
Publications established in 2009
Journals about philosophers
Catholic studies journals
Christian philosophy
Works about Bernard Lonergan
Philosophy Documentation Center academic journals